Hrastje is a small settlement in the foothills of the Gorjanci Hills in the Municipality of Šentjernej in southeastern Slovenia. The area is part of the traditional region of Lower Carniola. It is now included in the Southeast Slovenia Statistical Region.

Name
The name Hrastje is derived from the Slovene common noun hrast 'oak', referring to the local vegetation.

Castle
Gracar Turn is a 14th-century castle on the northern outskirts of the village.

References

External links

Hrastje on Geopedia

Populated places in the Municipality of Šentjernej